The Martin XB-48 was an American medium jet bomber developed in the mid-1940s. It competed with the Boeing B-47 Stratojet, which proved to be a superior design, and was largely considered as a backup plan in case the B-47 ran into development problems. It never saw production or active duty, and only two prototypes, serial numbers 45-59585 and 45-59586, were built.

Design and development
Other designs resulting from this competition, sometimes nicknamed "The Class of 45", included the North American XB-45 and the Convair XB-46. Production orders finally went to the North American B-45 Tornado, and even this airplane served only for a couple of years before again being replaced by the much more modern Boeing B-47 Stratojet, although the B-45 had the inherent performance – especially if it was not burdened with a payload – for it to then serve as a reconnaissance aircraft.

All of the bombers comprising the Class of '45 were transitional aircraft, which combined the power of turbojets with the aeronautical knowledge of World War II. The XB-48 was no exception, as its round fuselage and unswept wings showed a distinct influence of Martin's B-26 Marauder medium bomber. Still, where the B-26 had enough thrust with two massive 18-cylinder radial engines, the XB-48 needed no less than six of the new jet engines.

At the time of the XB-48's design, jet propulsion was still in its infancy. And, although it appeared superficially to have six separate engine nacelles – that is, three under each wing – the XB-48 actually had only two, unusually wide, three-engined nacelles. Each of these large nacelles also contained an intricate set of air ducts that constituted the engines' cooling system.

The XB-48 was the first aircraft designed with bicycle-type tandem landing gear, which had previously been tested on a modified B-26. The wing airfoil was too thin to house conventional landing gear mechanisms. The main landing gear was in the fuselage and small outriggers located on each wing were used to balance the aircraft.

Operational history
The XB-48 made its first flight on 22 June 1947, a 37-minute, 73 mi (117 km) hop from Martin's Baltimore, Maryland plant to NAS Patuxent River, Maryland, but blew all four tires on its fore-and-aft mounted undercarriage on landing when pilot Pat Tibbs applied heavy pressure to the specially-designed, but very slow to respond, insensitive air-braking lever. Tibbs and co-pilot Dutch Gelvin were uninjured.

Specifications (XB-48)

See also

References

Notes

Bibliography
Ginter, Steve. Martin XB-48.Simi Valley, California: Steve Ginter Books, 2022. 
 Jones, Lloyd S. U.S. Bombers, B-1 1928 to B-1 1980s. Fallbrook, CA: Aero Publishers, 1962, second edition 1974. .
 Mizrahi, Joe. "The Last Great Bomber Fly Off". Wings, Volume 29, Number 3, June 1999.

External links

Encyclopedia of US Air Force Aircraft and Missile Systems, Volume II
National Museum of the Air Force
GlobalSecurity.org
Film footage of the Martin XB-48

Martin B-48
B-48
Six-engined jet aircraft
Aircraft first flown in 1947
Mid-wing aircraft